WTHL is a Christian radio station licensed to Somerset, Kentucky, broadcasting on 90.5 MHz FM. The station is owned by Somerset Educational Broadcasting Foundation.

Programming
WTHL is the flagship station for Somerset Educational Broadcasting Foundation's King of Kings Radio network. Their programming includes Christian talk and teaching shows such as Thru the Bible with J. Vernon McGee, Love Worth Finding with Adrian Rogers, In Touch with Charles Stanley, Focus on the Family, and Unshackled!. WTHL also airs a variety of Christian music.

Simulcasts
King of Kings Radio is heard on seven other stations in Kentucky, Tennessee, and Ohio.

References

External links
WTHL's official website

THL
Radio stations established in 1987
1987 establishments in Kentucky
Somerset, Kentucky